Alum Fork is a stream in the U.S. state of West Virginia. It is a tributary of Leading Creek.

The water of Alum Fork is impregnated with alum, hence the name.

See also
List of rivers of West Virginia

References

Rivers of Lewis County, West Virginia
Rivers of West Virginia